The Ambassador of the United Kingdom to Armenia is the United Kingdom's foremost diplomatic representative in Armenia, and head of the UK's diplomatic mission in Yerevan.  The official title is His Britannic Majesty's Ambassador to the Republic of Armenia.

The UK recognised Armenia on 31 December 1991, and diplomatic relations were established on 20 January 1992 when the then ambassador to Russia, Sir Brian Fall, was also accredited to Armenia. The British Embassy in Yerevan was opened in July 1995.

Ambassadors to Armenia
1992–1995: Sir Brian Fall (non-resident)
1995–1997: David Miller
1997–1999: John Mitchiner
1999–2002: Timothy Marschall Jones
2003–2005: Thorhilda Abbott-Watt
2006–2008: Anthony Cantor
2008–2012: Charles Lonsdale
2012–2014: Jonathan Aves and Katherine Leach (joint appointment, alternating on a 4-monthly basis)
2014–2015: Katherine Leach

2015–2020: Judith Farnworth
2020– John Gallagher

References

External links
UK and Armenia, gov.uk

Armenia
 
United Kingdom